Nils Jönsson may refer to:

 Nils Jönsson (Oxenstierna), Swedish statesman and co-regent of Sweden
 Nils Jönsson i Rossbol (1893–1957), Swedish politician
 Nils Jonsson (football), Swedish football manager